Oi Oi Oi Remixed is a remix album from German electro-tech producer and DJ Boys Noize. It was released April 13, 2008 on Boysnoize Records. It features remixes from producers like Surkin, A-Trak, and Feadz.

Track listing

 & Down (Siriusmo vs. Boys Noize Mix) (3:40)
 Lava Lava (Feadz Aval Aval Mix) (4:15)
 The Battery (DJ Maxximus 8-Ball Refix) (3:53)
 Oh! (A-Trak Remix) (4:27)
 Let's Buy Happiness (Proxy Remix) (3:52)
 My Head (Para One Remix) (6:12)
 Shine Shine (Apparat Remix) (6:52)
 Don't Believe the Hype (Surkin Mix no. 2) (4:15)
 Frau (featuring I-Robots) (PUZIQUe Remix) (8:42)

Digital Release Bonus Tracks:

 Don't Believe the Hype (Proxy Remix) (4:58)
 Don't Believe the Hype (Housemeister Remix) (5:59)

References

Boys Noize albums
2008 remix albums